Harrison County Historical Museum is a historical museum in Marshall, Texas, dedicated to the history of Harrison County, Texas. The museum features twenty-two rooms of exhibits ranging in topic from the Native American Caddo culture to the history of the HBCU Wiley College.

The museum was in the Old Courthouse on Whetstone Square from 1964 until 2000.

The museum houses thousands of artifacts and also has an extensive photographic and text archive partially maintained by a genealogical society. Notable pieces housed in the museum include an Inaugural ball gown worn by Lady Bird Johnson and an accompanying suit worn by Lyndon Johnson, the Emmy that journalist Bill Moyers won for his documentary Marshall, Texas: Marshall, Texas, and George Foreman's world championship belt.

External links
Harrison County Historical Museum - official site
Photos

Museums in Harrison County, Texas
History museums in Texas
Marshall, Texas